Darko Stanojević may refer to:
 Darko Stanojević (footballer, born 1987), Serbian footballer
 Darko Stanojević (footballer, born 1997), Serbian footballer